Hitchgathering is the name of a series of international hitchhiking gatherings that are held in Europe and Northern America since 2008.

The first European Hitchgathering was initiated as The Project 888. It took place under the Eiffel Tower in Paris, France, on 8 August 2008. The following year's Hitchgathering 7-9-10 was organised in Ukraine and followed by the 6-8-10 gathering in Portugal. 5-8-11 was the fourth edition of the annual European Hitchgathering and took place at the beach by Kara Dere near the Black Sea coast of Bulgaria. In 2012, the gathering was named 4-8-12 and took place on a farm in Ambraziskiai, Lithuania.

The gatherings received moderate press coverage, in Spain, Ukraine, Netherlands and France. The goal of the gatherings is to promote hitchhiking and is self-organised among travelers.

The number of participants has so far varied between 80 and 150.

The location for the year 2013 was Liptovska Mara in Slovakia.

References

External links 

 Hitchwiki - A hitchhiking encyclopedia.
 Hitchgathering - "Official" page of the Hitchgathering.
 Hitchgathering Facebook Group
 Hitchgathering (and hitchhiking in general) email list
 

Hitchhiking
Itinerant living
Sustainable transport